Gaius Julius Alexander Berenicianus (about 75 – about 150) was a Cilician Prince and second-born son to King Gaius Julius Alexander and Queen Julia Iotapa of Cetis. His eldest brother was Gaius Julius Agrippa and his younger sister was Julia Iotapa.

Life
Surviving inscriptions about Berenicianus reveal that his family were related to important members of Asian, non-Jewish, and Jewish aristocracy. Berenicianus was of Jewish, Nabataean, Edomite, Greek, Armenian, Median and Persian origins. His paternal grandparents were King Tigranes VI of Armenia and his wife Opgalli. Through Tigranes, he was a descendant of King Archelaus of Cappadocia, as well as the King of Judea, Herod the Great, and his wife Mariamne. Agrippa along with his family and paternal relatives were among the last known descendants of the Herodian Dynasty. He was an apostate to Judaism. It is unlikely that Berenicianus attempted to exert influence on Judean politics. His name indicates that the family connections from the Herodian Dynasty were not wholly broken. His maternal grandparents were King Antiochus IV of Commagene and Queen Julia Iotapa. 

The Kingdom of Cetis was a small client state in the Roman Empire, in Cilicia, that was previously ruled by his Cappadocian royal ancestors and Antiochus IV. The city of Elaiussa Sebaste was a part of the Kingdom. When his parents married in Rome in 58 AD, the Emperor Nero crowned his parents as monarchs and gave them that region to rule. He was born, raised, and educated in Cetis.

In 94, Berenicianus, along with Agrippa entered the Roman Senate. Surviving inscriptions also reveal the career of Berenicianus. He served as a suffect consul in 116. Between 132 and 133, he was Proconsul of the Roman Province of Asia, during which he appeared to have been a patron of the arts. (BCH 1, 1877, 291, no. 80)

He married Cassia Lepida (born c. 80), daughter of Cassius Lepidus (son of Gaius Cassius Longinus and Junia Lepida). Through her father and paternal grandmother, Cassia was a direct descendant of the Emperor Augustus. Berenicianus and Cassia had a daughter named Julia Cassia Alexandra (born c. AD 105), who married Gaius Avidius Heliodorus (born c. AD 100). Heliodorus was ab epistulis under the emperor Hadrian and praefectus Aegypti between AD 138 and 140. Heliodorus and Alexandra had children, including the usurper Avidius Cassius. A possible descendant of Berenicianus was the 3rd-century usurper Jotapianus.

Sources
 acsearch.info ancient coin search engine: Kings of Armenia

1st-century Romans
2nd-century Romans
70s births
150s deaths
Year of birth uncertain
Year of death uncertain
People from Roman Anatolia
Herodian dynasty
Alexander Berenicianus, Gaius
Suffect consuls of Imperial Rome
Roman governors of Asia